Edwin Clarence Norton (July 5, 1856October 6, 1943) was an American academic. He was the first dean of Pomona College, where he worked from 1888 to 1926.

References

American academic administrators
Pomona College faculty
1856 births
1943 deaths
American university and college faculty deans